Antone S. Aguiar Jr. (January 2, 1930 – February 1, 2014) was an American judge and politician. He spent 18 years as a judge in the Attleboro District Court and two in the Fall River District Court before retiring in late 1999. He previously served in the Massachusetts House of Representatives from 1965 until 1982, when he was appointed to the bench by Governor Edward King. He was a Democrat who spent much of his life in Swansea, Massachusetts, where he graduated from Joseph Case High School in 1948.

See also
 1965–1966 Massachusetts legislature
 1977–1978 Massachusetts legislature

References

Democratic Party members of the Massachusetts House of Representatives
Massachusetts state court judges
1930 births
2014 deaths
20th-century American judges
People from Swansea, Massachusetts